Gorilla My Dreams is a Warner Bros. Looney Tunes theatrical animated short directed by Robert McKimson and written by Warren Foster.  The short was released on January 3, 1948, and stars Bugs Bunny.

The story is a parody of the many jungle films that were prominent in the 1930s and 1940s which often featured gorillas extensively (though not always behaviorally accurately), most notably the Tarzan films. The title is a play on the expression "Girl o' My Dreams". The short featured Gruesome Gorilla, who reappeared in Hurdy-Gurdy Hare and as a boss in Bugs Bunny and Taz Time Busters.

The cartoon was remade in 1959 as Apes of Wrath. The Gorillas later make their appearance in Looney Tunes Cartoons Valentine’s Extwavaganza!, only this time in their most substantial role to date where they are voiced by Fred Tatasciore while still being anthropomorphic as usual.

Plot
"Sweet Dreams, Sweetheart" plays briefly under the title card, and the cartoon opens with a trail of carrot tops floating on the seas. Bugs is stranded in a barrel in the middle of the ocean, but he does not seem to mind; he is reading Esquire magazine (considered an "adults only" magazine at that time) and singing the song "Down Where the Trade Winds Play" (a song made popular by Bing Crosby).

On the island of 'Bingzi-Bangzi – Land of the Ferocious Apes', the population is made up of gorillas that act like humans - they read the newspaper and books such as "The Apes of Wrath", have families, live in huts and speak American English (in the underscore, one of Stalling's orchestrations of Raymond Scott's jungle themes is heard, its official title being "Dinner Music for a Pack of Hungry Cannibals"). One of the apes, Mrs. Gruesome Gorilla, is sad that she does not have any children, whereas her husband (voiced by Mel Blanc) could not care less. Mrs. Gruesome (also voiced by Blanc, using a falsetto), crying, walks toward the water and says, "I'm going to ..." (the implication is she is going to jump in), but then spots Bugs floating by. Her mood instantly changes and, using vines as a mode of travel, she takes the barrel and Bugs to a tree-top (at one point, yielding the right-of-way to a man wearing just a leopard skin loincloth that looks strikingly like Tarzan). Just as Mrs. Gruesome picked up the barrel, Bugs had finished "Trade Winds" and had seguéd into a full verse of "Someone's Rocking My Dreamboat". He wraps that tune up just after they arrive and he becomes aware of the situation he is in. Clutching him, Mrs. Gruesome swings down to the ground where she makes it evident she sees Bugs as a baby gorilla. He explains he is a rabbit but she begins to cry, saying, "My baby doesn't love me." Bugs shares with the audience: "That's my soft spot—dames crying". - and figures he can "go along with a gag" to be her baby.

Mrs. Gruesome then presents Bugs to Mr. Gruesome—who is none too happy about having a baby in the house. Bugs tries to fit in, playing like a 'monkey'. Mr. Gruesome takes Bugs out for 'a walk', while Mrs. Gruesome makes dinner (she is not seen again for the rest of the cartoon).

"Daddy" is careless and rough with his "child" and Bugs, in typical fashion, gets back at Mr. Gruesome by hitting him over the head with a shovel. This enrages the gorilla. At first, Bugs goes toe-to-toe with him, posturing and roaring; but when he brings a coconut down on Mr. Gruesome's head, a long chase ensues (accompanied by a frenetic version of Stalling's jungle theme).

In due course, Bugs finds himself trapped on the edge of a cliff. He gives up and allows Mr. Gruesome to catch him. However, after tossing and slamming Bugs around, the gorilla is exhausted. A mere puff of breath from Bugs causes him to collapse.  Emerging as the 'victor', Bugs jumps up and catches a hanging branch, again playing 'monkey' (another short clip of the jungle theme is heard in the underscore, along with the time-honored "jungle" sound of a kookaburra) at iris-out.

Reception
Animation historian Mike Mallory writes, "Bugs Bunny is at his brashest and most fearless in Gorilla My Dreams, a drivingly funny romp staged with breathless energy and flawless timing by director Robert McKimson. This cartoon also pits the rabbit against one of his most formidable opponents... The ensuing grudge match between the roaring, angry would-be father and his recalcitrant, long-eared 'baby', set to the raucously jazzy music of Carl Stalling and Raymond Scott, is prime Warner Bros. cartooning."

Music
 "Down Where the Trade Winds Play", uncredited, by Cliff Friend, lyrics by Charles Tobias
 "Dinner Music for a Pack of Hungry Cannibals", uncredited, by Raymond Scott
 "Someone's Rocking My Dreamboat", uncredited, by Leon René, Otis René and Emerson Scott
 "Sweet Dreams, Sweetheart", uncredited, by Ray Noble
 "Congo", uncredited, by M.K. Jerome
 "Goombay Drum", uncredited, by Charles Lofthouse, Schuyler Knowlton and Stanley Adams
 "Ahí, viene la conga", uncredited, by Raúl Valdespí
 "Hey, Doc", uncredited, music by Edgar M. Sampson
 "Valurile Dunarii (Danube Waves)", uncredited, music by Iosif Ivanovici

Home media
Gorilla My Dreams is available, uncut and restored, on Looney Tunes Golden Collection: Volume 2 (Disc 1).

Gorilla My Dreams is available on Looney Tunes Platinum Collection: Volume 3 (Disc 1).

See also
List of Bugs Bunny cartoons

References

External links

 

 Gorilla My Dreams on the Internet Archive

1948 films
1948 short films
1948 animated films
1948 comedy films
1940s parody films
Looney Tunes shorts
Warner Bros. Cartoons animated short films
Films directed by Robert McKimson
Animated films about gorillas
Films set on islands
Films scored by Carl Stalling
Bugs Bunny films
1940s Warner Bros. animated short films
1940s English-language films